Jackie Powers is an American voice-over artist.  She is best known for her roles as Shyna Nera Shyna in Silhouette Mirage, and Nall in Lunar: Silver Star Story Complete.

Voice-over career

Powers' first voice-acting role was in 1993, when she voiced Nall in Lunar: The Silver Star. In 1999, she reprised the role of Nall in the latest version of Lunar: Silver Star Story, called LUNAR: Silver Star Story Complete, and took on the additional role of the character Mia Ausa. Next, in 2000, she voiced the role of Shyna Nera Shyna in the English-language version of Silhouette Mirage. In 2004, she portrayed Karene Langley in Growslanser II: The Sense of Justice, and also voiced the character Monika Allenford in the English-language version of Growslanser III: The Dual Darkness.  Her most recent role is that of the character Fair, from the video game Summon Night 6: Lost Borders.

Filmography

Video games

References

External links
 

Living people
American voice actresses
Year of birth missing (living people)
21st-century American women